Andraševec  is a village located in the municipality of Oroslavje in Krapina-Zagorje County, Croatia.

Demographics 
In the 2011 census, there were 859 inhabitants in Andraševec.

In the census of 2011, the absolute majority were Croats.

References

External links

Populated places in Krapina-Zagorje County